Zoë Lewis is an English folk musician from Brighton, England.

Discography

Albums
 Rotary Phone (2012)
 A Cure for the Hiccups (2008)
 Small is Tremendous (2005)
 Fishbone, Wishbone, Funnybone (2001)
 Sheep (1998)
 Full of Faraway (1996)
 A Little Piece of Sky (1994) (cassette only)

References

External links
Official website
The Graham Weekly Album Review #1424 -- Zöe Lewis: Small Is Tremendous
Folk Plus Saturday 16 November 2002 Interviews: Part Three: Zoe Lewis

Year of birth missing (living people)
Living people
English folk musicians
English emigrants to the United States
English women singer-songwriters